Winona Area Public Schools is the public school system in Winona, Minnesota, United States.  It is also known as Independent School District 861. The superintendent is Dr. Annette Freiheit  .

The local public school system includes eight early learning programs, three elementary schools, the Winona Middle School, an alternative school, and the Winona Senior High School.

The three elementary schools in the district are Goodview Elementary, Jefferson Elementary, and Washington-Kosciusko Elementary (W-K).

References

External links

Education in Winona County, Minnesota
School districts in Minnesota